The 1920 Rochester Jeffersons season was the franchise's inaugural season in the American Professional Football Association (APFA) and thirteenth as an American football team. The Jeffersons entered 1920 coming off a six-win, two-loss, two-tie (6–2–2) record in the New York Pro Football League (NYPFL) where it lost the championship game to the Buffalo Prospects. Several representatives from another professional football league, the Ohio League, wanted to form a new national league, and thus the APFA was created.

Ownership, roster, and coaching nearly stayed the same for the 1920 season. The team opened the season with a 10–0 victory over the non-APFA All-Buffalo. The only time the Jeffersons played a game against an APFA team was week six, when they lost to the Buffalo All-Americans. The team ended with a 6–3–2 record, which was good enough for them to finish sixth place in the final standings. The sportswriter Bruce Copeland compiled the 1920 All-Pro list, but no players from the Jeffersonss were on it. As of 2012, no player from the 1920 Rochester Jeffersons has been enshrined in the Pro Football Hall of Fame.

Offseason 
The Rochester Jeffersons finished 6–2–1 in their 1919 season. It lost the NYPFL championship to the Buffalo All-Americans. After the 1919 season, representatives of four Ohio League teams—the Canton Bulldogs, the Cleveland Tigers, the Dayton Triangles, and the Akron Pros—called a meeting on August 20, 1920, to discuss the formation of a new league. At the meeting, they tentatively agreed on a salary cap and pledged not to sign college players or players already under contract with other teams. They also agreed on a name for the circuit: the American Professional Football Conference. They then invited other professional teams to a second meeting on September 17.

At that meeting, held at Bulldogs owner Ralph Hay's Hupmobile showroom in Canton, representatives of the Rock Island Independents, the Muncie Flyers, the Decatur Staleys, the Racine Cardinals, the Massillon Tigers, the Chicago Cardinals, and the Hammond Pros agreed to join the league. Representatives of the All-Americans and Rochester Jeffersons could not attend the meeting, but sent letters to Hay asking to be included in the league. Team representatives changed the league's name slightly to the American Professional Football Association and elected officers, installing Jim Thorpe as president. Under the new league structure, teams created their schedules dynamically as the season progressed, so there were no minimum or maximum number of games needed to be played. Also, representatives of each team voted to determine the winner of the APFA trophy.

Schedule 

A  The Professional Football Researchers Association states the game was played at Canisius Field.

Standings

Notes

References

External links 
 Crippen, Ken (July 27, 2009). "The Rochester Jeffersons Take to the National Stage (Part 1)". Two Bills Drive. Retrieved March 14, 1920.

Rochester Jeffersons seasons
Rochester Jeffersons
Rochester